Skystone Systems was a fabless semiconductor company based in Ottawa, Canada. Skystone Systems developed a family of semiconductor products to enable data connectivity in Datacom Equipments (i.e. Ethernet switches or IP Routers) for wide area networks. The flagship product of Skystone Systems was an OC-48 Packet Over SONET Processor (also referred to as an Application Specific Standard Part), first in the industry.

The company was co-founded by Antoine Paquin and Stefan Opalski in 1994. Prior to Skystone, they worked together in Nortel Networks (Bell Northern Research). Early employees of Skystone were Hojjat Salemi (CTO), Brian Stemmler and Niall F.Quaid, CA (VP Finance).  The key ideas that developed the foundation of the start up were developed in Stefan Opalski's house. He was instrumental to acquire key talent from well establish companies such as Nortel Networks and Mitel. Antoine also started other companies after Skystone.

Acquisition by Cisco
Skystone was acquired by Cisco Systems on June 9, 1997 for 1 million shares of Cisco common stock worth approximately $66.5 million (based on Cisco's June 9 closing price of $66.50) and $22.6 million cash. This was the first acquisition of Cisco Systems outside USA.

At the time of acquisition, Skystone Systems had 40 employees and became part of the Cisco Service Provider line of business. It presently operates as Cisco System Ottawa group.

In a news release, Cisco Systems said the following for the reason for this acquisition, 
"Network transport of multiple types of information is rapidly becoming commonplace worldwide, for two reasons. First, the traditionally disparate communication channels of voice, video, and data are converging. And second, these channels are being integrated using the standard Internet protocol (IP). The acquisition of Skystone underscores Cisco's commitment to this new market with the ability to offer users a cost-effective SONET/SDH capability. SONET/SDH is the emerging transport technology used for carrying information in very-high-capacity backbone networks, such as those operated by telecommunications carriers and large internet service providers. Cisco intends to leverage Skystone development efforts on new SONET/SDH transport technologies for integration within next- generation Cisco products."
Skystone Systems has been a very successful acquisition for Cisco, it provided new expertise, business growth and contribution to the bottom line. Graeme Fraser and Bill Swift of Cisco systems were key people that help to integrate & build the vision along Skystone's team . The work done as part of this acquisition in Cisco Systems, created key innovative technologies, such as, Optical Interworking, IP over WDM, 10G optical Module MSA (300pin)...

Defunct software companies of Canada
Cisco Systems acquisitions